The following outline is provided as an overview of and topical guide to the U.S. state of Louisiana:

Louisiana – U.S. state located in the southern region of the United States of America. Louisiana is the only state in the U.S. with political subdivisions termed parishes, which are local governments equivalent to counties. Some Louisiana urban environments have a strong multicultural and multilingual heritage, influenced by an admixture of 18th century French, Spanish, Native American (Indian) and African inhabitants.

General reference 

 Names
 Common name: Louisiana
 Pronunciation: , 
 Official name: State of Louisiana
 Abbreviations and name codes
 Postal symbol:  LA
 ISO 3166-2 code:  US-LA
 Internet second-level domain:  .la.us
 Nicknames
 Bayou State (previously used on license plates)
 Child of the Mississippi
 Creole State
Fisherman's Paradise
Holland of America
 Pelican State
 Sportsman's Paradise (currently used on license plates)
 Sugar State
 Adjectival: Louisiana
 Demonym: Louisianian

Geography of Louisiana 

Geography of Louisiana
 Louisiana is: a U.S. state, a federal state of the United States of America
 Location
 Northern Hemisphere
 Western Hemisphere
 Americas
 North America
 Anglo America
 Northern America
 United States of America
 Contiguous United States
 Central United States
 West South Central States
 Western United States
 Southern United States
 Black Belt
 Deep South
 Gulf Coast of the United States
 South Central United States
 Population of Louisiana: 4,533,372  (2010 U.S. Census)
 Area of Louisiana:
 Atlas of Louisiana

Places in Louisiana 

 Historic places in Louisiana
 National Historic Landmarks in Louisiana
 National Register of Historic Places listings in Louisiana
 Bridges on the National Register of Historic Places in Louisiana
 National Natural Landmarks in Louisiana
 National parks in Louisiana
 State parks in Louisiana

Environment of Louisiana 

 Climate of Louisiana
 Protected areas in Louisiana
 State forests of Louisiana
 Superfund sites in Louisiana

Natural geographic features of Louisiana 

 Rivers of Louisiana

Regions of Louisiana 

 Central Louisiana
 Southwestern Louisiana

Administrative divisions of Louisiana 

 The 64 parishes of the state of Louisiana
 Municipalities in Louisiana
 Cities in Louisiana
 State capital of Louisiana:
 City nicknames in Louisiana
 Towns in Louisiana
 Census-designated places in Louisiana

Demography of Louisiana 

Demographics of Louisiana

Geology of Louisiana 

Brown Dense oil and gas play
Louisiana Geological Survey
Haynesville Shale oil and gas play
Paleontology in Louisiana

Government and politics of Louisiana 

Politics of Louisiana
 Form of government: U.S. state government
 United States congressional delegations from Louisiana
 Louisiana State Capitol
 Elections in Louisiana
 Political party strength in Louisiana

Branches of the government of Louisiana 

Government of Louisiana

Executive branch of the government of Louisiana 
Governor of Louisiana
Lieutenant Governor of Louisiana
 Secretary of State of Louisiana
 State departments
 Louisiana Department of Transportation

Legislative branch of the government of Louisiana 

 Louisiana State Legislature (bicameral)
 Upper house: Louisiana Senate
 Lower house: Louisiana House of Representatives

Judicial branch of the government of Louisiana 

Courts of Louisiana
 Supreme Court of Louisiana

Law and order in Louisiana 

Law of Louisiana
 Cannabis in Louisiana
 Capital punishment in Louisiana
 Individuals executed in Louisiana
 Constitution of Louisiana
 Crime in Louisiana
 Gun laws in Louisiana
 Law enforcement in Louisiana
 Law enforcement agencies in Louisiana
 Louisiana State Police
 Same-sex marriage in Louisiana

Military in Louisiana 

 Louisiana Air National Guard
 Louisiana Army National Guard

History of Louisiana 

History of Louisiana

History of Louisiana, by period 
Poverty Point culture, 2200 - 700 BCE
Tchefuncte culture, 600 BCE - 200 CE
Marksville culture,  100 BCE to 400 CE
Fourche Maline culture, 300 BCE to 800 CE
Baytown culture, 300 to 700 CE
Coles Creek culture, 700 - 1200
Plaquemine culture, 1200–1400
Caddoan Mississippian culture, 800 - 1600
Native groups at time of European settlement
Spanish colony of Florida, 1565–1763
Treaty of Paris of 1763
French colony of Louisiane, 1699–1764
History of slavery in Louisiana, 1706–1865
Treaty of Fontainebleau of 1762
Spanish colony of Tejas, (1721–1773)-1821
Los Adaes, 1721–1773
British Province of West Florida, 1763–1783
Treaty of Paris of 1783
Spanish (though predominantly Francophone) district of Baja Luisiana, 1764–1803
Rebellion of 1768
Third Treaty of San Ildefonso of 1800
Spanish colony of Florida Occidental, 1783–1821
Republic of West Florida, 1810
French district of Basse-Louisiane, 1803
Louisiana Purchase of 1803
Unorganized territory of the United States, 1803–1804
Territory of Orleans, 1804–1812
Sabine Free State, 1806–1821
U.S. unilaterally annexes Florida Parishes, 1810
History of Louisiana#Incorporation into the United States and antebellum years (1803-1860)State of Louisiana since April 30, 1812
War of 1812, 1812–1815
Battle of New Orleans, 1815
Adams-Onis Treaty of 1819
Louisiana in the American Civil War, 1861–1865
Confederate States of America, 1861–1865
Louisiana in Reconstruction, 1865–1868
Hurricane Katrina, 2005

History of Louisiana, by region 

 by city
 History of New Orleans
 New Orleans in the American Civil War
 History of Baton Rouge
 History of Shreveport
 History of Metairie, Louisiana
 by parish
 History of Orleans Parish, Louisiana (Orleans Parish has the same boundaries as the city of New Orleans)
 History of Jefferson Parish, Louisiana

History of Louisiana, by subject 

 History of slavery in Louisiana

Culture of Louisiana 

Culture of Louisiana
 Museums in Louisiana
 Religion in Louisiana
 The Church of Jesus Christ of Latter-day Saints in Louisiana
 Episcopal Diocese of Louisiana
 Scouting in Louisiana
 State symbols of Louisiana
 Flag of the State of Louisiana 
 Great Seal of the State of Louisiana

The arts in Louisiana 
 Music of Louisiana
 Theater in Louisiana

Sports in Louisiana 

Sports in Louisiana

Economy and infrastructure of Louisiana 

Economy of Louisiana
 Communications in Louisiana
 Newspapers in Louisiana
 Radio stations in Louisiana
 Television stations in Louisiana
 Health care in Louisiana
 Hospitals in Louisiana
 Transportation in Louisiana
 Airports in Louisiana
 Roads in Louisiana
 State highways in Louisiana

Education in Louisiana 

Education in Louisiana
 Schools in Louisiana
 School districts in Louisiana
 High schools in Louisiana
 Colleges and universities in Louisiana
 University of Louisiana (disambiguation)
 Louisiana State University

See also

Topic overview:
Louisiana

Index of Louisiana-related articles

References

External links 

Louisiana Geographic Information Center
Louisiana Endowment for the Humanities
Louisiana Weather and Tides

Ecoregions
Ecoregions of Louisiana
Ecoregions of the Mississippi Alluvial Plain

Geology links
Geology
Generalized Geologic Map of Louisiana, 2008
Generalized Geology of Louisiana (text to Generalized Geologic Map of Louisiana)
Loess Map of Louisiana
Other Louisiana Geological Maps
Louisiana Geofacts

Government
Official State of Louisiana website
Louisiana State Databases – Annotated list of searchable databases produced by Louisiana state agencies and compiled by the Government Documents Roundtable of the American Library Association.
Census Statistics on Louisiana

Federal politics
Energy Profile for Louisiana
USDA Louisiana Statistical Facts
USGS real-time, geographic, and other scientific resources of Louisiana
: Steve Scalise – Website
: Cedric Richmond – Website & Campaign Website
: Jeff Landry – Website
: John C. Fleming –
: Rodney Alexander – Website
: Bill Cassidy
: Charles Boustany – Website

News media
The Times-Picayune major Louisiana newspaper
WWL-TV Louisiana television station

Tourism
Official site of Louisiana tourism
Official site of the New Orleans Convention & Tourism Bureau
Official site of New Orleans Plantation Country tourism

Louisiana
Louisiana